Zbignev Balcevič pol. Zbigniew Balcewicz (born 27 July 1946) is a Polish-Lithuanian politician.  In 1990 he was among those who signed the Act of the Re-Establishment of the State of Lithuania.

References
 Biography

1946 births
Living people
People from Vilnius District Municipality
Lithuanian politicians
Lithuanian people of Polish descent
Soviet people of Polish descent
Signatories of the Act of the Re-Establishment of the State of Lithuania